Ai Sugiyama and Elena Tatarkova were the defending champions, but did not compete this year.

Qualifiers Akiko Morigami and Saori Obata won the title by defeating Alina Jidkova and Bryanne Stewart 6–1, 6–1 in the final.

Seeds

Draw

Draw

References
 Main and Qualifying Draws

2003 Kroger St. Jude International
2003 WTA Tour